Phil Lawrence can refer to:

 Phil Lawrence (sailor) (born 1955), British Olympic sailor
 Phil Lawrence (sport shooter) (born 1945), British Olympic sport shooter